L Is for Lover is the eighth studio album by American R&B singer Al Jarreau, released on September 8, 1986 by Warner Bros. Records. It peaked at No. 30 on the Billboard Top Soul Albums chart, No. 9 on the Traditional Jazz Albums chart, and No. 17 on the Contemporary Jazz Albums chart.

Nile Rodgers, the album's producer, called it "the best thing I ever made that didn't sell" in the July 27, 2015, issue of New York magazine. "The theme from [TV series] Moonlighting was on it, but Al and I thought it wasn't cool enough. So we took it off the album. That becomes a hit, and the album sank. Shows what I know." The single version of the Moonlighting theme, originally included on the show's 1987 soundtrack album, was added to Friday Music's 2011 reissue of L Is for Lover along with a remix of the album's title track and the 12-inch extended mix of "Tell Me What I Gotta Do." The Rodgers-produced version of Moonlighting'''s theme song was used in the opening and closing credits of each episode of the show's fourth (1987–1988) and fifth (1988–1989) seasons.

Critical reception

Richard S. Ginell of AllMusic called the album "a perhaps surprisingly scintillating collaboration with one of the leading dance-music producer/guitarists of the time, Nile Rodgers (of Chic). Not only did Rodgers and Jarreau assemble some strong tunes from many sources, Rodgers took advantage of Jarreau's rhythmic capabilities, for some of the material is too deliciously complicated for any old R&B soulster to pull off." He added, "Hear the way Jarreau brilliantly threads his way through the rhythmically complex hornet's nest of 'Says' in English and French, or savor the sheer ecstatic energy of the chorus of 'Pleasure' and the rapid-fire list of cities in the title track; this is first-class pop recordmaking."

J. D. Considine of Musician wrote, "It isn't simply that Rodgers reins in the singer's almost freakish virtuosity, although that helps; more to the point, the arrangements provide both focus and contrast for the singing, so that the flash bits truly excite. Best of all, from the EW&F swing of 'Golden Girl' to the Chic-style groove of the title tune, Rodgers ties the vocals so closely to the beat that it's impossible not to be captivated."

Track listing

 Personnel 
Credits are adapted from the L Is for Lover'' liner notes.

 Al Jarreau – lead vocals, backing vocals (2, 7, 10), vocoder (10)
 Philippe Saisse – keyboards, keyboard bass (3, 4, 7, 9), acoustic piano solo (5), Synclavier horns (10)
 Kevin Jones – Synclavier programming
 Peter Scherer – keyboard bass (5, 10), keyboards (9, 10)
 Nile Rodgers – guitars, keyboard bass (1, 2), keyboards (2), backing vocals (2, 4, 5, 7, 8, 10), vocoder (10)
 Hiram Bullock – guitars (4, 8), guitar solo (8)
 Anthony Jackson – bass guitar (6, 8)
 Jimmy Bralower – drums (1, 2), percussion (1, 2)
 Steve Ferrone – second hi-hat cymbal (2), drums (3-10)
 Leonard Gibbs – percussion (1, 3, 5-10)
 Mac Gollehon – brass (1, 9)
 Robert Aaron – reeds (1, 9)
 Tawatha Agee – backing vocals (2, 3, 6, 7, 10)
 Lisa Fischer – backing vocals (2, 7, 10)
 Diane Garisto – backing vocals (2, 7, 10)
 Terri Gonzalez – backing vocals (2, 8)
 Brenda King – backing vocals (2, 4, 5, 7, 8, 10)
 Curtis King – backing vocals (2-8, 10)
 Michelle Cobbs – backing vocals (3-6, 8)
 Fonzi Thornton – backing vocals (3, 6)
 Cindy Mizelle – backing vocals (4, 5, 8)

Production 
 Producer – Nile Rodgers
 Recorded and Mixed by James Farber at Skyline Studios (New York, NY).
 Second Engineer – Scott Ansell
 Additional Second Engineering – Tom Durack
 Digitally Edited by Barry Diament at Atlantic Studios (New York, NY).
 Digitally Mastered by Bob Ludwig at Masterdisk (New York, NY).
 Production Managers – Kevin Jones and Budd Tunick
 Album Coordination – Shirley Klein
 Art Direction – Jeffrey Kent Ayeroff and Michael Hodgson
 Design – Michael Hodgson
 Photography – Paul Jasmin
 Styling – Maria Sarno/Dangerous Wardrobe
 Management – Patrick Raines & Associates (Los Angeles, CA).

Charts

References

External links

1986 albums
Al Jarreau albums
Albums produced by Nile Rodgers
Warner Records albums